India Pride Project (IPP) is a group of art enthusiasts who uses social media to identify stolen religious artefacts from Indian temples and secure their return. Co-founded in 2014 by two Singapore-based art enthusiasts, S. Vijay Kumar and Anuraag Saxena, it now has activists from all over the world.

Recoveries

References

External links 
 

Stolen works of art
Art crime
Indian art
Indian sculpture
Cultural organisations based in India
Art and cultural repatriation
2014 establishments in India
Arts organisations based in India
India–United States relations
India–United Kingdom relations